Emmanuelle Grey Rossum (born September 12, 1986) is an American actress, director, and singer. She is known for her portrayal of Fiona Gallagher in the television series Shameless (2011–2019). Since the mid-2010s, she has also directed and produced television, including the 2022 Peacock series Angelyne in which she also stars.

Born and raised in New York City, she began professionally performing as a child with the Metropolitan Opera. Early on-screen roles included Genius (1999), Songcatcher (2000), Passionada (2002), and Nola (2003). At sixteen, she was cast in her breakthrough role in Mystic River (2003). Rossum starred in the 2004 sci-fi film The Day After Tomorrow, and also received critical acclaim for her performance in the leading role of Christine Daaé in the film adaptation of The Phantom of the Opera (2004). She is also well known for acting in the films Poseidon (2006), Dragonball: Evolution (2009), Inside (2011), Beautiful Creatures (2013), Comet (2014), You're Not You (2014), and Cold Pursuit (2019).

In 2007, Rossum released her debut album, Inside Out. She also released a Christmas EP the same year, titled Carol of the Bells. In 2013, she released a follow-up album called Sentimental Journey.

Early life 
Emmanuelle Grey Rossum was born on September 12, 1986, in New York City. She is the only child of Cheryl Rossum, a single mother who worked as a corporate photographer. Her parents separated while her mother was pregnant, and as of 2007, she had met her father only twice. 

Rossum's mother is Jewish of Russian Jewish descent, and her father is Protestant of English and Dutch ancestry. Rossum identifies as Jewish and has stated that her mother instilled in her the "Jewish code of ethics and morals". She was named for her great-grandfather, whose first name was Emanuel, using the feminine spelling.

Upon singing "Happy Birthday" in all 12 keys, Rossum was welcomed to join the Metropolitan Opera Children's Chorus by chorus director Elena Doria at age seven. Over the course of five years she sang onstage with the chorus and had the chance to perform with singers such as Plácido Domingo and Luciano Pavarotti. For anywhere from $5 to $10 a night, Rossum sang in six languages in 20 operas, including La bohème, Turandot, a Carnegie Hall presentation of La damnation de Faust, and A Midsummer Night's Dream. She also worked under the direction of Franco Zeffirelli in Carmen. 

An increasing interest in pursuing acting led to taking classes with Flo Salant Greenberg of The New Actors Workshop in New York City. She has also worked with acting coach Terry Knickerbocker.

Rossum attended the Spence School, a private school in Manhattan, before dropping out to pursue career opportunities. She received her high school diploma at fifteen years old via online-extension courses offered by Stanford University's Education Program for Gifted Youth (EPGY). She enrolled at Columbia University, studying French, art history and philosophy.

Career

Acting 
Rossum's television debut was in August 1997, as the original Abigail Williams in the daytime soap opera As the World Turns. She also had a guest role as Caroline Beels in Snoops. Rossum was nominated for a Young Artist Award in 1999 for Best Performance in a TV movie for her work in the made-for-TV movie Genius. She then portrayed a young Audrey Hepburn in the ABC television film The Audrey Hepburn Story (2000).

Rossum made her film debut at 13, in 2000's Songcatcher, as Deladis Slocumb, an Appalachian orphan. Debuting at the Sundance Film Festival, the film won the Special Jury Award for Outstanding Ensemble Performance. For her role, Rossum received an Independent Spirit Award nomination for Best Debut Performance and also had the opportunity to sing a duet with Dolly Parton on the Songcatcher soundtrack. Variety magazine named Rossum as "One of the Ten to Watch" in 2000.

In Nola (2003), Rossum played the title character, an aspiring songwriter. In her first major studio film, Clint Eastwood's Mystic River (2003), Rossum starred as Katie Markum, the ill-fated daughter of small-business owner Jimmy Markum, played by Sean Penn.

Rossum had a breakthrough role as Laura Chapman in the sci-fi-disaster film The Day After Tomorrow (2004). She later returned to New York, where she was the last to audition, in full costume and make-up, for the role of Christine Daaé in The Phantom of the Opera (2004), the onscreen adaptation of composer Andrew Lloyd Webber's musical of the same name. After having nearly missed the audition due to a family engagement, Rossum was asked to audition in person for Lloyd Webber at his home in New York. For her performance, Rossum received a Golden Globe Award nomination for Best Actress in a musical or comedy. She also received a Critics' Choice Award for Best Young Actress, along with a Saturn Award for Best Performance by a Younger Actor.

In 2006, Rossum appeared in Poseidon, Wolfgang Petersen's remake of the disaster film The Poseidon Adventure. She played Jennifer Ramsey, the daughter of Kurt Russell's character. Rossum described the character as being proactive and strong in all situations, rather than a damsel in distress. Rossum also appeared as Juliet Capulet in a 2006 Williamstown Theatre Festival production of William Shakespeare's Romeo and Juliet. In early 2009, Rossum appeared in a poorly received Dragonball Evolution. Her next big screen venture was the indie Dare, which was an official selection of the 2009 Sundance Film Festival. In November 2009, Rossum appeared in Broadway's 24 Hour Plays in which actors, writers, and directors collaborate to produce, and perform six one-act plays within 24 hours to benefit the Urban Arts Partnership. Rossum appeared in Warren Leight's "Daily Bread", directed by Lucie Tiberghien.

In December 2009, Rossum joined the cast of the Showtime dramedy series Shameless, based on the British series of the same title. The series co-stars William H. Macy. Rossum plays the oldest sister of a large, motherless family, functioning as a guardian/surrogate mother to her five younger siblings. The series has received consistent acclaim, with Rossum's performance being universally praised. She made her directorial debut with episode four of season seven, "I Am a Storm." In December 2016, Rossum was in a contract dispute with the show's producers over her desire for a salary equal to that of co-star Macy and back pay for the differential over seven seasons, which was resolved later that month. Following this news, Shameless was renewed for its eighth season beginning production in 2017. In August 2018, Rossum announced her departure from Shameless after nine seasons.

In mid-2011, Rossum starred in D. J. Caruso's social film, Inside; the online film aired in several segments, incorporating multiple social media platforms including Facebook, YouTube, and Twitter. The following year, Rossum played Ridley, a siren Caster in Beautiful Creatures (2013), based on the young adult fantasy novel of the same name. Although the film was released to mixed reviews, Rossum's performance was praised by critics and fans. She also starred in the drama You're Not You as Bec, an inexperienced caregiver who looks after and befriends Kate (Hilary Swank), who suffers from the degenerative disease ALS. By June 2013, Rossum was cast as the female lead opposite Justin Long in the independent romantic comedy Comet, which was directed by Sam Esmail, to whom she later became engaged. Afterward she appeared in the film Before I Disappear (2014), based on the Academy Award-winning short film Curfew.

In 2019, it was announced that Rossum would star in Angelyne, a drama series co-produced by her husband and longtime collaborator Sam Esmail, for Peacock, the new streaming service by NBC. The limited series was her first lead role after Shameless and was based on The Hollywood Reporter senior writer Gary Baum's investigative feature on the LA billboard model Angelyne.

Music 
After her role in The Phantom of the Opera, Rossum was offered several deals to record Classical music albums, but refused, opting to create an album of contemporary, more mainstream music. She explained it by feeling frustrated because of the lack of "emotional honesty" in music played in radios. Regarding the sound and style of her music, she said, "It's pop music, but not Britney Spears bubblegum pop. I want it to have a David Gray or Annie Lennox feel. I've been spending up to 12 hours a day in the studio." Rossum cites Sarah McLachlan, Whitney Houston, Celine Dion and Faith Hill as some of her influences.
Rossum's album Inside Out was produced by Stuart Brawley. It was released on October 23, 2007, and peaked at 199 in the U.S. Billboard charts. For the promotion of the record, Geffen Records featured the song, "Slow Me Down," as part of the second volume of Hollywood Records' Girl Next compilation album, which was released on July 10, 2007. Later that year, she was chosen as Yahoo's "Who's Next" artist of the month and a "One to Watch" by MSN. In December 2007, Rossum released three Christmas songs on the EP Carol of the Bells. It was also this year that Rossum sang the national anthem at the Save Mart 350 NASCAR NEXTEL Cup Series race at Infineon Raceway and performed at the first ever Perez Hilton Presents event at the El Rey Theatre in Hollywood. On October 27, 2007, Rossum again sang the national anthem at the New Jersey Devils's first home game of the 2007–08 NHL season, which was also the first game the team played in the newly constructed Prudential Center. She also performed at the Hollywood Christmas Celebration at the Grove in Los Angeles and the Lighting of the Great Tree in Atlanta, Georgia.

She joined Counting Crows, Augustana, and Michael Franti & Spearhead as a "special guest" for select performances of the "Traveling Circus and Medicine Show" tour in early 2009.

In 2010, Rossum sang a song called "Cruel One" on singer Alex Band's debut solo album We've All Been There. On the track she sings with Band, and Chantal Kreviazuk.

Rossum released the Warner Bros. Records album Sentimental Journey on January 29, 2013. Unlike Inside Out on which Rossum wrote the songs herself, the album is a collection of covers of songs from the 1920s to 1960s. Sentimental Journey peaked at 92 on the U.S. Billboard charts, and number one in Jazz Albums.

Rossum describes herself as a lyric soprano, while saying her voice is still developing. She continues to train vocally at ZajacStudio, a studio run by soprano Joann C. Zajac.

Charity work and advocacy
Rossum was a YouthAIDS ambassador. In 2008, she was signed as the spokesperson for Pinkitude, an apparel line inspired by the Pink Panther character, to help raise breast cancer awareness. In 2010, she appeared in public service announcements for the Natural Resources Defense Council (NRDC) Action Fund. She also works with Global Green USA to raise money for environmental protection and awareness of ecological issues. In 2015, Rossum campaigned with the Best Friends Animal Society to encourage animal adoption.

On May 26, 2009, Rossum attended a march in West Hollywood California protesting the California Supreme Court's ruling to uphold Proposition 8.

Personal life 

Rossum married Justin Siegel on February 17, 2008, though they publicly presented themselves as in a relationship but unmarried. He filed for divorce 19 months later on September 25, 2009, in Los Angeles, citing irreconcilable differences, and the divorce was finalized on December 28, 2010. In August 2015, Rossum became engaged to writer/director Sam Esmail after two years of dating, and the couple married on May 29, 2017, at a Reform synagogue in New York City. On May 23, 2021, Rossum gave birth to their daughter after keeping her pregnancy a secret from the media.

She is a relative, by marriage, of designer Vera Wang, who was married to Rossum's cousin, investor and real-estate developer Arthur P. Becker. Rossum has described herself as "a spiritual person, but not especially religious."

Filmography

Film

Television

Awards and nominations

Discography

Albums / EPs

Singles

Music videos

References

External links 

 
 
 
 
 
 
 

1986 births
20th-century American actresses
21st-century American actresses
21st-century American singers
21st-century American women singers
Activists from New York City
Actresses from New York City
American child actresses
American child singers
American environmentalists
American film actresses
American people of Dutch descent
American people of English descent
American people of Russian-Jewish descent
American operatic sopranos
American spiritualists
American television actresses
American women environmentalists
Columbia University alumni
Geffen Records artists
Jewish American actresses
Jewish American musicians
Jewish singers
Living people
New York (state) Democrats
People from Manhattan
Spence School alumni
Warner Records artists
American women television directors
American television directors
21st-century American Jews